Dorothy Prior, later Shute, (13 October 1911 – 14 June 1997) was a Canadian breaststroke swimmer. She competed at the 1928 Summer Olympics and the 1932 Summer Olympics.

References

External links
 

1911 births
1997 deaths
Canadian female breaststroke swimmers
Olympic swimmers of Canada
Swimmers at the 1928 Summer Olympics
Swimmers at the 1932 Summer Olympics
Swimmers from Toronto
20th-century Canadian women